Wat Champa is an ancient Thai Buddhist temple in Bang Ramat Sub-District, Taling Chan District, Bangkok's Thonburi side.

History
Wat Champa (literally: champak temple) was built in the late Ayutthaya period and underwent a massive restoration in the King Rama III's reign during early Rattanakosin period. The gables of the ordination hall of temple are studded with Chinese porcelain and the window frames are made of elaborately carved wood. Behind this hall is a pool of holy water that is more than 100 years old, it never runs dry and the water is believed to cure illnesses.

The principle Buddha statue named "Luang Por Chokdee" (หลวงพ่อโชคดี), which means "lucky venerable father".

Tourism
Wat Champa Community or Ko San Chao Community (ชุมชนเกาะศาลเจ้า) is a community of locals who living around this temple. The community is bounded by highways and urban development all around but it is inaccessible by road creating a verdant oasis filled with fruit plantations and khlongs (canal), hence the name ko or island in Thai. This community is believed to last more than 500 years.

The reason it was called Ko San Chao (shrine island), because there is a shrine located at the center of the community, where Khlong Bang Ramat meet Khlong Ban Sai. It is a shrine of "Chao Por Chui" (เจ้าพ่อจุ้ย), the water tutelar that the locals respect for a long time since the past.

Nowadays, they still maintain the traditional way of life as in the past, there is also homestay in traditional Thai style for visitors to experience the authentic way of life here. Moreover, this community is also the last source that still maintains the banana engraving method, which is a traditional sculpting works used in various auspicious ceremonies.

Also not far from other tourist attractions that are floating markets such as Wat Champa, Taling Chan or Khlong Lat Mayom etc.

Wat Champa and its community are not accessible by BMTA bus because they are located in an area that is down the gardens and khlongs. Visitors in addition to being accessible by boat can also take a  songthaew (Thai style minibus) from Siriraj Piyamaharajkarun Hospital for an eight baht fare.

References

External links

Taling Chan district
Buddhist temples in Bangkok
Unregistered ancient monuments in Bangkok
Tourist attractions in Bangkok